"Bulletproof" is a song by English synth-pop duo La Roux from their eponymous debut studio album (2009). Written and produced by the duo's members, Elly Jackson and Ben Langmaid, the song was released digitally in the United Kingdom on 21 June 2009 and physically the following day as the album's third single.

"Bulletproof" was met with both critical and commercial success, debuting at number one on the UK Singles Chart. It was a sleeper hit in the United States, where it peaked at number eight on the Billboard Hot 100 in June 2010, following televised performances of the song on The Ellen DeGeneres Show and Last Call with Carson Daly. It had been downloaded 2,324,000 times in the US as of September 2012. It also reached within the top 10 of Australia, Austria, the Belgian territory of Flanders, Ireland, New Zealand and Ukraine. The song was used in a 2022 advertisement for Telfast.

Writing
Jackson discussed writing "Bulletproof":

Critical reception
"Bulletproof" received acclaim from music critics. One author of Pitchfork called it "a catchy-as-hell electro-pop smash", and another, Joshua Love, called it the best song on La Roux. Digital Spy music editor Nick Levine gave the song five stars and described it as "a bright, bouncy slice of Yazoo-ish electropop with a chorus every bit as immediate as 'In For The Kill'", adding that "Jackson's vocals are less shrill this time around, but she comes off just as formidable, informing a useless sod who's messed her about that she won't be letting him do it again." Fraser McAlpine of the BBC Chart Blog, who also awarded the song five stars, stated that "the one sentence that crops up most often goes something like this: "...yes, 'Bulletproof' is brilliant, but...", hinting that this might be a song which possesses magical powers of persuasion." He went on to give five points on why the song is good: marvellous verses, marvellous chorus, the music serves the song brilliantly, less shrill to the singing, and the vocoder breakdown. Adam R. Holz of Plugged In opined "Homage isn't a strong enough word to capture just how uncannily La Roux has repackaged that vibe of yore popularized by the likes of Erasure, The Human League, Depeche Mode and Eurythmics."

In a more mixed review from Common Sense Media, however, Stephanie Bruzzese gave "Bulletproof" two stars, calling the song a "less creative imitation of the classic tunes created by [1980s groups including Depeche Mode, Erasure, and The Human League]" and criticizing the chorus for being "nothing unique" and Jackson's vocal performance which she described as "a higher, whinier version of Alison Moyet's". On a lighter note, she highlighted the lyrical content for being clean and the strong positive message, suggesting to parents that the song was appropriate for kids twelve years of age or older.

In a September 2014 interview, Jackson expressed regrets of the song's critical and commercial success, because it was one of the reasons she was experiencing panic attacks while touring for the debut album: "I wasn't that keen on it. I don't know if I want to have a hit like that again [...] But it's 10 years ago for me now and I think it's weird when so many people see you as being represented by that song, and you feel so far away from it. [...] You stop being able to be respected in any way shape or form. I started to feel that basically [...] I really didn't like it" Also in the interview, she looked back at the song's music video, saying she'd "wish I could erase it! I don't want it to erase the house that I bought from it."

Music video
Directed by The Holograms@UFO and Production Design by Alun Davies, the music video for "Bulletproof" opens with various retro patterns and abstract geometric designs in one scene. Then the camera shows Jackson sitting in a chair in a bright setting with her eyes closed. As the song starts, Jackson leaves the chair and the camera pans to show random designs of La Roux which are shown behind her. She continues to walk, while singing the song itself. At the bridge of the song, she stops and then the song starts to build to the chorus and she starts walking again while polyhedra bounce around her. The video ends with Jackson sitting back in dark setting with her eyes open. During the video, there is a variation of Jackson in the setting of bright and dark colours. Throughout the video, Jackson is styled in high-fashion clothes by House of Holland and others where references to Piet Mondrian's lozenge works can be seen. The music video was also the final music video that aired on VH1 MegaHits for it ceased broadcasting on August 31 2020 (in Latin America).

Accolades

Track listings

UK CD single
"Bulletproof" – 3:25
"Bulletproof" (Zinc Remix) – 4:49
"Bulletproof" (Tepr Remix) – 5:36

UK 7-inch single
A. "Bulletproof" – 3:25

UK digital EP
"Bulletproof" – 3:25
"Bulletproof" (Zinc Remix) – 5:48
"Bulletproof" (Tepr TsunAimee Remix) – 5:35

US CD single
"Bulletproof" – 3:25
"Bulletproof" (Tepr TsunAimee Remix) – 5:35
"Bulletproof" (Zinc Remix) – 5:48
"Bulletproof" (Lagos Boys Choir Remix) – 5:16

US digital EP – Remixes
"Bulletproof" (Dave Audé Cherry Radio Remix) – 3:55
"Bulletproof" (Manhattan Clique Remix Radio) – 3:27
"Bulletproof" (Tepr TsunAimee Remix) – 5:35
"Bulletproof" (Zinc Remix) – 5:49
"Bulletproof" (Lagos Boys Choir Remix) – 5:16

The Gold EP – digital
"Bulletproof" (live at Shepherd's Bush) – 5:26
"Bulletproof" (Tim Bran Remix) – 3:26
"Bulletproof" (Tiborg Remix) – 3:27
"Bulletproof" (Fred Falke Remix) – 7:48

Credits and personnel
Credits adapted from the liner notes of La Roux.

Recording and management
 Recorded at Elfin Studios (Teddington, London)
 Mixed at MixStar Studios (Virginia Beach, Virginia)
 Published by Big Life Music Ltd.

Personnel
 Elly Jackson – vocals, production
 Ben Langmaid – production
 Serban Ghenea – mixing
 John Hanes – mix engineering
 Tim Roberts – mix engineering assistance

Charts

Weekly charts

Year-end charts

Certifications

Release history

See also
 List of UK Singles Chart number ones of the 2000s
 List of number-one dance singles of 2009 (U.S.)

References

2009 singles
2009 songs
Cherrytree Records singles
Interscope Records singles
La Roux songs
Polydor Records singles
UK Singles Chart number-one singles